Running Delilah is a 1993 American made-for-television science fiction thriller film directed by Richard Franklin, starring Kim Cattrall and Billy Zane, and aired on ABC. It was intended as the pilot episode for a TV series.

Plot
Top agent Delilah dies in a risky mission against weapons dealer Kercharian. She is revived using high-tech medicine and given artificial body parts. She returns as an invincible superwoman and continues her fight against Kercherian, who is currently seeking plutonium from Russia.

Cast
 Kim Cattrall as Christina / Delilah
 Billy Zane as Paul
 François Guétary as Lucas
 Yorgo Voyagis as Alec Kasharian
 Diana Rigg as Judith
 Michael Francis Clarke as Operative #1
 Dawn Comer as Language Lab Technician
 Rob LaBelle as Watcher
 Marilyn McIntyre as Barbara
 Philip Moon as Technician #2
 Quentin O'Brien as Operative #2
 Philip Sokoloff as Iraqi Scientist
 Eric Stone as Liaison
 Richard Topol as Technician #1
 Victor Touzei as Security Guard #1

Production
The production was filmed in 1992 but not broadcast on television until 1994.

Home video
It was released on video in Japan, Sweden, and the UK in 1993, followed by the USA and Germany in 1994. The film was known as Robospy in Australia and was released on video in the UK as Cyborg Agent.

References to old movies
The overall concept may be based on RoboCop (1987), which was regarded as a modern classic at the time.

A hideout uses the password "swordfish", a reference to Horse Feathers (1932).

Delilah and Paul watch clips of It's a Wonderful Life (1946) on their Paris hotel's television, dubbed into French.

References

External links

1990s American films
1990s science fiction thriller films
1993 television films
1993 films
1993 crime thriller films
Action television films
American crime thriller films
American science fiction television films
American science fiction thriller films
American thriller television films
Crime television films
Films about amputees
Films directed by Richard Franklin (director)
Films scored by Lee Holdridge
Television films as pilots
Television pilots not picked up as a series